The Kunsthalle Bielefeld is a modern and contemporary art museum in Bielefeld, Germany.  It was designed by Philip Johnson in 1968, and paid for by the businessman and art patron Rudolf August Oetker.

Collection and exhibitions
Initiated in 1950 with a donation by Oetker and gradually expanded from 1954 with municipal acquisitions, the collection focuses on Expressionism, international sculpture, and contemporary art. The permanent collection features a wide array of 20th-century art, including paintings by Pablo Picasso and Max Beckmann, works by the Blaue Reiter group and movements centred on László Moholy-Nagy and Oskar Schlemmer, and more recent art from the 1970s and '80s.  The museum stands in a sculpture garden featuring works by Auguste Rodin, Henry Moore, Richard Serra, Ólafur Elíasson and other modern sculptors.

At the 50th Venice Biennale in 2003, the Kunsthalle presented the documentary "Ilya und Emila Kabakov: Die Utopische Stadt. 1997-2003", which was on permanent display in the "Utopia Station Now!". As part of its series of exhibitions of important museum collections of twentieth- and twenty-first-century art, the Bundeskunsthalle Bonn presented »The Unknown Bielefeld Collection« in 2011.

The Kunsthalle also hosts temporary exhibitions to complement the permanent collection.  Recent examples have been devoted to Emil Nolde, Rirkrit Tiravanija, and the locally born artist Peter August Böckstiegel together with Conrad Felixmüller.  The 1991 exhibition "Picasso's Surrealism: 1925–1937", one of five internationally renowned Picasso exhibitions in 1984, 1988, 1993, and 2011, attracted 67,000 visitors; an exhibition in 2007–08, featuring art from 1937 in a variety of styles, had 47,000.

The museum also offers guided tours, teaching activities for children, and a library.

Architecture

The museum is located on the south-west edge of Bielefeld's old town. It was built in 1968 by the American architect Philip Johnson in the International Style that he had founded, and is his only museum building in Europe. Johnson had been invited by the museum's director Joachim Wolfgang von Moltke and Rudolf August Oetker in 1966. In 1994, Frank O. Gehry proposed an extension to the existing building; it was never realized. The museum was refurbished in 2002.

The facade is of red sandstone.

Naming dispute
When he endowed the building, Rudolf Oetker expressed a desire for it be called the Richard-Kaselowsky-Haus, after his stepfather. Kaselowsky was a controversial figure in Bielefeld due to his Nazi past, including membership in not only the NSDAP but also the Freundeskreis der Wirtschaft. This led to a debate in Bielefeld, coinciding with the general social unrest of 1968 and becoming a major theme of it.  The composer Hans Werner Henze cancelled the piano concert he had written for the inauguration, and the Minister-President of North Rhine-Westphalia, Heinz Kühn, excused himself from the ceremony along with two federal ministers.  This led to the event, with 1,200 invitees, being completely cancelled – but the city council stuck to its choice of name.  The "silent" opening on 27 September 1968 was accompanied by protests. A memorial to Kaselowsky, commemorating him as a victim of the heavy aerial bombing of September 1944, remains in the entrance hall to this day.

In the following years, the Kunsthalle ceased using the controversial part of its name in public. The discussion was revived in 1998 when the then-director, Thomas Kellein, sought to strengthen ties with the Oetkers and resurrected the Kaselowsky name.  After the attempt to reach an uncontroversial solution failed, the city council changed the name to simply Kunsthalle Bielefeld, whereupon Rudolf Oetker ended his support and withdrew all the works that he had loaned to the collection.

Management
The Kunsthalle's current director is Friedrich Meschede (since 2011). Former directors include Thomas Kellein (1996–2011), Ulrich Weisner (1974–1996), Joachim Wolfgang von Moltke (1961–1974), and Gustav Vriesen (1954–1961).

See also
 List of art museums
 List of museums in Germany

External links
 Home page in English

Further reading
Hans-Jörg Kühne: Bielefeld '66 bis '77: wildes Leben, Musik, Demos und Reformen. Bielefelder Beiträge zur Stadt- und Regionalgeschichte, vol. 21. Kiper, 2006, Bielefeld. .

Notes

Art museums and galleries in Germany
Museums in North Rhine-Westphalia
Art museums established in 1968
Philip Johnson buildings
1968 establishments in West Germany
Buildings and structures in Bielefeld